The Wishing-Chair is a series of two novels by the English author Enid Blyton, and a third book published in 2000 compiled from Blyton's short stories. The three children's stories are as follows:
Adventures of the Wishing-Chair, 1937 (publ. George Newnes, illustrated by Hilda McGavin)
The Wishing-Chair Again, 1950 (publ. George Newnes, illustrated by Hilda McGavin)
More Wishing-Chair Stories, 2000 (publ. Mammoth, illustrated by Anthony Lewis)

The first book, Adventures of the Wishing-Chair, has the distinction of being Enid Blyton's first full-length novel — although it is episodic in nature. A TV series was made in 1998 as part of Enid Blytons Enchanted Lands.

Adventures of the Wishing-Chair
Mollie and Peter, searching for a birthday present for their mother, find a mysterious antiques shop which appears to be run by fairy folk. There, they find a magic Wishing-Chair with the power to grow wings and fly. After the chair rescues them from the shop, and gets them home, they decide to keep the chair in their playroom. On their first adventure, they rescue a pixie called Chinky (renamed to Binky in revised editions) from a giant. The pixie comes to live in their playroom, and the remainder of the book concerns the adventures of the children, as the chair takes them, and Chinky (later named Binky) to various magical places.

The Wishing-Chair Again
It's the first day of the summer holidays and Peter and Mollie are dying to go on more adventures with their Wishing-Chair. Peter inadvertently asks to go to the land of "Goodness-Knows-Where", but in the process of going there the Wishing-Chair is stolen. They eventually get it back and a few days later, the Wishing-Chair only grows three wings. They end up in the Land of Slipperies and when Peter offends one of them, they retaliate by chopping all the chair's wings off, so they get some ointment which grows the wings back.

On the next rainy day, they inadvertently grow wings on their toys and the toys end up at Mr Grim's school where mischievous brownies are sent. They befriend a brownie called Winks and successfully get Mr Grim to relinquish the toys. Winks takes up residence in Peter and Mollie's house and they take him on adventures, but on the last day of the holidays, he is sent back to Mr Grim's school for being too naughty.

More Wishing-Chair Stories
In this final book, Mollie and Peter are home for the half-term holiday and Winks and the Wishing-Chair are ready to fly away with them to magical lands. They visit the Land of Wishes, the Land of Scally-Wags and help Santa Claus deliver presents on Christmas Eve. 

Published in 2000, the book is a compilation of stories made up
from removed chapters of the previous books as well as material from Sunny Stories and Enid Blyton's Omnibus!

Television adaptation
An animated series, Enid Blyton's Enchanted Lands, based on stories from The Wishing Chair and The Faraway Tree series was broadcast in 1997 and 1998. A selection of episodes, "The Ho Ho Wizard", "The Grabbit Gnomes", "Poor Lost Jigs", "The Land of Dreams", "The Disappearing Islands", "The Magician's Party" and "The Chair Clowns About" were later released on VHS and DVD. The voice cast were: Richard Pearce, Julia Harrison-Jones, Mark Channon, Nigel Pelgram, Adrienne Posta and David Holt.

In popular culture
The wishing-chair is briefly seen at the end of The Black Dossier by Alan Moore.

References

Book series introduced in 1937
Enid Blyton series
Series of children's books
Children's fantasy novels